The 2018–19 Maryland Terrapins men's basketball team represented the University of Maryland, College Park in the 2018–19 NCAA Division I men's basketball season.  They were led by eighth-year head coach Mark Turgeon and played their home games at Xfinity Center in College Park, Maryland, as members of the Big Ten Conference. They finished the season 23–11, 13–7 in Big Ten play to finish in fifth place. They lost in the second round of the Big Ten tournament to Nebraska. They received an at-large bid to the NCAA tournament as the No. 6 seed in the East region. There they defeated Belmont before losing to LSU in the Second Round.

Previous season
The Terrapins finished the 2017–18 season 19–13, 8–10 in Big Ten play to finish in eighth place. They lost in the second round of the Big Ten tournament to Wisconsin. They were invited to the College Basketball Invitational, but declined, marking their absence in a postseason tournament for the first time since 2014.

Offseason

Departures
On April 6, 2018, freshman forward Bruno Fernando announced he would test the NBA draft, but not sign with an agent. On May 28, he announced he would return to school. Sophomore guard Kevin Huerter declared for the NBA draft on April 20, 2018, but also announced he would not sign with an agent. On May 30, he announced he would stay in the draft and hire an agent thereby ending his college career.

Recruiting class

2018 recruiting class

Roster

Depth chart

Schedule and results
The season will mark the first time in Big Ten history that the teams will play a 20-game conference schedule, setting a precedent for all Division I basketball. The new schedule will also include a regional component to increase the frequency of games among teams in similar areas. Over the course of a six-year cycle (12 playing opportunities), in-state rivals will play each other 12 times, regional opponents will play 10 times, and all other teams will play nine times. Three in-state series will be guaranteed home-and-homes: Illinois and Northwestern, Indiana and Purdue, and Michigan and Michigan State will always play twice. The conference opponent list was released on April 19, 2018.

|-
!colspan=9 style=|Exhibition

|-
!colspan=9 style=|Regular season

|-
!colspan=9 style=|

|-
!colspan=9 style=|

Awards and honors
 Bruno Fernando 
First Team All-Big Ten (coaches/media)
Big-Ten All-Defensive Team

Anthony Cowan Jr.
Preseason All-Big Ten team
Second Team All-Big Ten (coaches/media)

Jalen Smith
Big Ten All-Freshman Team

Rankings

*AP does not release post-NCAA Tournament rankings

References

Maryland Terrapins men's basketball seasons
Maryland
Terra
Terra
Maryland